Xyloiulus is an extinct genus of millipede that lived during the Late Carboniferous which grew up to  in length. Fossils of the animal have been found in North America and Europe. The fossils are typically found in Sigillarian stumps.

References

External links
 Fossil image- Natural History Museum, London
 Xyloiulus fossils- NADIPLOCHILO.com

Millipede genera
Prehistoric myriapod genera
Carboniferous myriapods
Carboniferous animals of Europe
Carboniferous animals of North America
Fossil taxa described in 1895
Paleozoic life of Nova Scotia